TUN is a Danish product standard numbering system identifying building materials, managed by Danish Timber & Building Merchants' Trade Organization (Trælasthandlerunionen). Currently more than 30,000 products are identified. TUN numbers are assigned to suppliers identifying products and therefore a product with several suppliers can have more than one TUN number. TUN numbers are currently being mapped against UNSPSC.

References

See also 
 ETIM (standard)

Trade and industrial classification systems
Industry in Denmark